Nichita Stănescu (born Nichita Hristea Stănescu; 31 March 1933 – 13 December 1983) was a Romanian poet and essayist.

Biography
Stănescu's father was Nicolae Hristea Stănescu (1908–1982). His mother, Tatiana Cereaciuchin, was Russian (originally from Voronezh, she had fled Russia and married in 1931). Nichita Stănescu graduated from the Ion Luca Caragiale High School in Ploiești, then went on to study Romanian language and literature at the University of Bucharest, graduating in 1957. He made his literary debut in the Tribuna literary magazine.

Stănescu married Magdalena Petrescu in 1952, but the couple separated a year later. In 1962 he married Doina Ciurea. In 1982 he married Todorița "Dora" Tărâță.

For much of his career, Stănescu was a contributor to and editor of Gazeta  Literară, România Literară, and Luceafărul.

His editorial debut was the poetry book Sensul iubirii ("The Aim of Love"), which appeared under the Luceafărul selection, in 1960. He also was the recipient of numerous awards for his verse, the most important being the Herder Prize in 1975 and a nomination for the Nobel Prize in 1980. The last volume of poetry published in his lifetime was Noduri și semne ("Knots and Signs"), published in 1982. A heavy drinker, he died of cardiopulmonary arrest.

He left behind poems such as: 
 O viziune a sentimentelor – "A Vision of Feelings"
 Dreptul la timp – "The Right to Time"
 11 Elegii – "11 Elegies"
 Necuvintele – "The Unwords"
 Un pământ numit România – "A Land Called Romania"
 Epica Magna
 Opere imperfecte – "Imperfect Works"
 Noduri și semne – "Knots and Marks"

Awards
 The Romanian Writers' Union Award (1964, 1969, 1972, 1975) 
 Herder Prize (1975) 
 Romanian Academy's “Mihai Eminescu” Award (1975)
 Golden Wreath laureate of the Struga Poetry Evenings (1982) 
 Elected post-mortem member of the Romanian Academy

Legacy
There is a national poetry festival and an award named Stănescu in his honor.

In Ploiești, there is a high school named after him. In Pipera (Voluntari) a new road has been named in his honor.

Volumes
 1960 – Sensul iubirii ("The Meaning of Love")
 1964 – O viziune a sentimentelor ("A Vision of Feelings")
 1965 – Dreptul la timp ("The Right to Time")
 1966 – 11 elegii ("11 Elegies")
 1967 –
Roşu vertical ("Vertical Red"), 
Alfa,
Oul şi sfera ("The Egg and the Sphere")
 1968 – Laus Ptolemaei
 1969 –
Necuvintele ("The Unwords"), 
Un pământ numit România ("A Land Called Romania")
 1970 – În dulcele stil classic ("In Sweet Classical Style")
 1972 –
Cartea de recitire ("The Re-reading Book")
Belgradul în cinci prieteni ("Five Friends in Belgrade")
 ("The Greatness of Cold")
 1978 – Epica Magna
 1979 – Opere imperfecte ("Imperfect Works")
 1980 – Carte de citire, carte de iubire ("Book for Reading, Book for Loving")
 1982 – Oase plângând ("Crying Bones")
 1982 – Noduri și semne ("Knots and Marks")
 1982 – Respirări ("Breaths")

Posthumous volumes
 1984 – Album memorial ("Memorial Album")
 1985 – Antimetafizica – Nichita Stănescu însoțit de Aurelian Titu Dumitrescu ("Antimetaphysics – Nichita Stănescu accompanied by Aurelian Titu Dumitrescu")
 1985 – Nichita Stănescu – Frumos ca umbra unei idei ("Nichita Stănescu – Beautiful as the Shadow of an Idea")
 1993 – Cântece la drumul mare, 1955–1960 ("Songs on the Open Road, 1955–1960")
 1993 – Tânjiri spre firesc ("Longings toward the Usual")
 1995  –  Cărțile sibiline ("The Sibylline Books")
 1998  –  Fel de scriere ("A Kind of Writing")
 Noua frontieră a sufletului uman ("The New Frontier of the Human Spirit")
 Scrisori ("Letters")

Presence in English Language Anthologies 
 Testament - 400 Years of Romanian Poetry - 400 de ani de poezie românească - bilingual edition - Daniel Ioniță (editor and principal translator) with Daniel Reynaud, Adriana Paul & Eva Foster - Editura Minerva, 2019 - \
 Romanian Poetry from its Origins to the Present - bilingual edition English/Romanian - Daniel Ioniță (editor and principal translator) with Daniel Reynaud, Adriana Paul and Eva Foster - Australian-Romanian Academy Publishing - 2020 -  ;

Further reading
 Eugen Simion, Scriitori români de azi, vol. I, Bucharest, Editura Cartea Românească, 1978 
 Ion Pop, Nichita Stănescu – spaţiul şi măştile poeziei, Bucharest, Editura Albatros, 1980
 Alex. Ştefănescu, Introducere în opera lui Nichita Stănescu, Bucharest, Editura Minerva, 1986
 Daniel Dimitriu, Nichita Stănescu – geneza poemului, Iaşi, Editura Universităţii „Al. Ioan Cuza”, 1997
 Doina Uricariu, Nichita Stănescu – lirismul paradoxal, Bucharest, Editura Du Style, 1998
 Corin Braga, Nichita Stănescu – orizontul imaginar, Cluj, Editura Dacia, 2002
 Mircea Bârsilă, Introducere în poetica lui Nichita Stănescu, Piteşti, Editura Paralela 45, 2006

References

External links

  Romanian Poetry – Nichita Stanescu
  Romanian Poetry – Nichita Stanescu
  Collection of Nichita Stanescu's works
  Nichita Stanescu Foundation
  Mircea Gociman about Nichita
 Persian translation in Persian anthology of world poetry
  Books by Nichita Stanescu on Amazon.com (Romanian)

Members of the Romanian Academy elected posthumously
People from Ploiești
Romanian essayists
Romanian male poets
Romanian people of Russian descent
University of Bucharest alumni
Burials at Bellu Cemetery
1933 births
1983 deaths
20th-century Romanian poets
Struga Poetry Evenings Golden Wreath laureates
Male essayists
20th-century essayists
Herder Prize recipients
20th-century Romanian male writers